Ahmed Osman may refer to:

Ahmed Osman (author), Egyptian author about ancient Egypt
Ahmed Osman (politician), Moroccan politician and former PM
Ahmed Osman (runner) (born 1988), American long-distance runner
Ahmed Bilal Osman, Sudanese politician